HMS Handy was a  which served with the Royal Navy.  Built by Fairfield Shipbuilding and Engineering Company in 1895 she spent most of her time on the China Station, and was sold in Hong Kong during the Great War.

Design and construction
Of the 36 destroyers, three ships (Handy,  and ) were ordered from Fairfield Shipbuilding and Engineering Company of Govan, the first torpedo craft to be built by that shipyard. As typical for torpedo craft at the time, the Admiralty left detailed design to the builders, laying down only broad requirements.

Displacement was  light and  full load, while the ship's complement was 53 officers and men. Two funnels were fitted. Armament consisted of a single QF 12 pounder 12 cwt gun and three 6-pounder guns, with two 18 inch (450 mm) torpedo tubes. As a gunboat, one of the torpedo tubes could be removed to accommodate a further two six-pounders.

Handy was laid down on 7 June 1894 and was launched on 9 March 1895. Handy reached a speed of  during sea trials, and was commissioned in October 1895.

Service
Handy was initially based at Portsmouth, her commanding officer, Reginald Tupper, becoming commander of the Portsmouth destroyer flotilla when the destroyers  and  joined Handy in commission at Portsmouth in November 1895. The Fairfield-built Twenty-seven knotters were considered good sea boats, so suitable for service on overseas stations. Handy was sent out to Hong Kong in 1897–1898, a year after her sister ship Hart, to serve on the China Station, remaining there for the rest of her career. The bow structure of Handy required strengthening, which was carried out by April 1901.

In January 1901, Handy took part in the salvaging of the dredger Canton River, which had sunk in Hong Kong harbour during a Typhoon in November 1900, with Handy being used to pump air into the hull of the stricken vessel. In November 1911, when the Xinhai Revolution caused Chang Ming-Ch'i, Governor-General of Kwangtung province to abandon his post, Handy ferried him from Canton to safety in Hong Kong.

Handy was paid off in 1912, and by March 1913 Handy was placed on the sale list. She was finally sold in Hong Kong in 1916.

References

Notes

Citations

Bibliography
 

 

Handy-class destroyers
Ships built in Govan
1895 ships